Kazadi is a given name and a surname, usually found in the Democratic Republic of the Congo. It may refer to:

Given name
Kazadi Mwamba (1947-1998), Congolese footballer and goalkeeper

Surname
Nicolas Kazadi (born 1966), Congolese politician
Jacques Kazadi (born 1936), Congolese politician
Bestine Kazadi (born 1963), Congolese writer
Fernand Kazadi (1925–1984), Congolese politician
Jonathan Kazadi (born 1989), Swiss basketball player
Patricia Kazadi (born 1988), Polish actress, singer, dancer, and television personality
Patrick Kazadi (born 1977), Congolese footballer
King Kazadi Diofua (birth 1900?), Last  King of the Bakwa Dishi people
Angelique Kazadi (born 1945) Congolese heiress and daughter of Kazadi Diofua the last King of the Bakwa Dishi
Moses Kazadi (born 1964), New Zealand and Congolese psychologist and businessman